Siphlonurus is a genus of primitive minnow mayflies in the family Siphlonuridae. There are more than 40 described species in Siphlonurus.

Species
These 43 species belong to the genus Siphlonurus:

 Siphlonurus abraxas Jacob, 1968
 Siphlonurus aestivalis (Eaton, 1903)
 Siphlonurus alternatus (Say, 1824)
 Siphlonurus armatus Eaton, 1870
 Siphlonurus autumnalis McDunnough, 1931
 Siphlonurus barbaroides McDunnough, 1929
 Siphlonurus barbarus McDunnough, 1924
 Siphlonurus binotatus (Eaton, 1892)
 Siphlonurus chankae Tshernova, 1952
 Siphlonurus columbianus McDunnough, 1925
 Siphlonurus croaticus Ulmer, 1920
 Siphlonurus davidi (Navás, 1932)
 Siphlonurus decorus Traver, 1932
 Siphlonurus demarayi Kondratieff & Voshell, 1981
 Siphlonurus demaryi Kondratieff & Voshell, 1981
 Siphlonurus flavidus (Pictet, 1865)
 Siphlonurus grisea (Navás, 1912)
 Siphlonurus hispanicus Demoulin, 1958
 Siphlonurus immanis Kluge, 1985
 Siphlonurus irenae Alba-Tercedor, 1990
 Siphlonurus ireneae Alba-Tercedor, 1990
 Siphlonurus lacustris Eaton, 1870
 Siphlonurus luridipennis (Burmeister, 1839)
 Siphlonurus lusoensis Puthz, 1977
 Siphlonurus marginatus Traver, 1932
 Siphlonurus marshalli Traver, 1934
 Siphlonurus minnoi Provonsha & McCafferty, 1982
 Siphlonurus mirus (Eaton, 1885)
 Siphlonurus montanus Studemann, 1992
 Siphlonurus muchei Braasch, 1983
 Siphlonurus noveboracana (Lichtenstein, 1796)
 Siphlonurus occidentalis (Eaton, 1885)
 Siphlonurus palaearcticus (Tshernova, 1930)
 Siphlonurus phyllis McDunnough, 1923
 Siphlonurus quebecensis (Provancher, 1878)
 Siphlonurus rapidus McDunnough, 1924
 Siphlonurus sanukensis (Takahashi, 1929)
 Siphlonurus securifer McDunnough, 1926
 Siphlonurus spectabilis Traver, 1934
 Siphlonurus typicus (Eaton, 1885)
 Siphlonurus yoshinoensis (Gose, 1979)
 Siphlonurus zhelochovtsevi Tshernova, 1952
 † Siphlonurus dubiosus Demoulin, 1968

References

Further reading

External links

 

Siphlonuridae
Articles created by Qbugbot